Gemmobacter lanyuensis is a Gram-negative, facultatively anaerobic bacterium from the genus of Gemmobacter which has been isolated from a freshwater spring from Taiwan.

References

External links
Type strain of Gemmobacter lanyuensis at BacDive -  the Bacterial Diversity Metadatabase

Rhodobacteraceae
Bacteria described in 2013